The Browns polymetallic ore deposit is a large ore deposit located at Mount Fitch, near Batchelor, 64 kilometres south of Darwin, Northern Territory, Australia.

The Browns deposit consists of a sizeable, +80 million tonne deposit of nickel-copper-cobalt, with some poorly defined zones of uranium, and extensive zones of lead-zinc mineralization having been discovered in recent years.

Geology
The Browns deposit has a quoted JORC resource of 84 million tonnes of ore grading 0.78% copper, 0.11% cobalt and 0.12% nickel. This is a global resource hosted in four separate zones;
 Browns (40Mt @ 0.49% Cu, 4.53% Pb, 0.109% Co, 0.09% Ni, 13ppm Ag)
 Browns East (30.5Mt @ 1.29% Cu, 1.28% Pb, 0.13% Co, 0.13% Ni, 11ppm Ag)
 Area 55 (12.2Mt @ 0.49% Cu, 0.56% Pb, 0.14% Co, 0.14% Ni)
 Mount Fitch (1.3Mt @ 0.60% Cu, 0.2% Co, 0.2% Ni)

The global resources are subdivided into oxide and sulfide resources. The oxide resources consist of supergene or weathered sulfide ore where the ore mineralogy is dominated by metal oxides, hydroxides, clays and carbonates after the original sulfide mineralogy.

Exploitation 
The Browns deposit is currently being developed as a major base metals mine by Compass Resources NL, an Australian public company, in joint venture with Hunan Nonferrous Metals Corporation, a Chinese government company.

The mine is due to be complete in August 2008, after suffering cost escalation and construction delays, and will produce 15,000 tonnes of copper, 4,000 tonnes of cobalt and 4,000 tonnes of nickel per annum, with a mine life of 30 years, mining the oxide and supergene ores. The processing plant includes solvent extraction and electrowinning processing equipment.

The sulfide resources are hosted beneath the supergene and oxide zone ores and as yet no processing plant has been built to treat the pristine sulfide ores.

On 29 January 2009, Compass Resources went into voluntary administration, while in the process of commissioning the mine.

Mount Fitch uranium 
In 2006, Compass Resources reported resources of 4050 tonnes U3O8 at Mount Fitch. On 4 April 2007, Compass Resources advertised their application for a Mineral Lease over the Mt Fitch uranium deposit. Development of the uranium resources has not been advanced beyond conceptual stages.

See also 
 Ore genesis
 Mining
 Mineral resource classification
 Compass Resources
 Extractive metallurgy
 List of uranium mines

References 

Uranium mining in the Northern Territory
Nickel mines in the Northern Territory
Copper mines in the Northern Territory
Lead mines in the Northern Territory
Cobalt mines in the Northern Territory
Surface mines in Australia